The London Midland and Scottish Railway (LMS) 2 and 2A boilered 4-6-0 locomotives were express passenger 4-6-0 steam locomotives. In 1935 W.A. Stanier, Chief Mechanical Engineer of the LMS, ordered the rebuilding of the unique experimental high pressure compound locomotive 6399 Fury. The Schmidt-Henschel boiler was replaced with a tapered boiler, with a drumhead smokebox, designated type 2. The type 2 boiler had a tube surface of 1669 square feet, formed by tubes 2⅛ inches in diameter and 14' 3" long. It was fitted with a 28 row superheater with 360 square feet of heating surface. The superheater elements, 1⅛ inch in diameter, were fitted into flue tubes 5⅛ inches diameter. On test the boiler performed poorly, heat transfer to the water being inadequate because the hot gases from the firebox passed too rapidly through the tubes to the smokebox. The rapid passage of gas was indicated by too high a temperature in the smokebox, and the choking of the smokebox by excessive char carried through from the firebox. The boiler was re-tubed with 180 smaller tubes 1⅞ inches diameter, and with superheater elements 1¼ inch diameter. The single blastpipe was replaced with a double blastpipe and chimney to provide adequate gas velocity in the smokebox. This, combined with the increased rate of evaporation provided by the re-tubing, improved the performance of the boiler substantially. 

The performance of Stanier's Jubilee Class also suffered from incorrect boiler proportions. In 1935 a design for an improved taper boiler was schemed out; this was 13 feet long, with 198 tubes 1¾ inches in diameter. In 1943 Stanier instructed Coleman, the chief designer at Derby, to rebuild two of the Jubilee class with boilers to this design. This type of boiler was designated type 2A. Combined with modifications to the steam ports and valve gear, the rebuilding produced locomotives that were more powerful and economical than either the original Jubilees or the Royal Scots.

As the boilers of the Royal Scots were due for replacement, and their built-up smokeboxes were proving difficult to keep airtight, the decision was taken to rebuild the class in batches. They were also fitted with type 2A boilers. Rebuilding started in 1943, and eventually all 70 members of the class were rebuilt.

From 1946, 18 of the 52-strong Patriot Class (which shared the same chassis as the Royal Scots) also received 2A boilers.

List of locomotives
A total of 91 locomotives were rebuilt. Dates of building and numbers of engines are given in the following table.

Withdrawal 

All 91 locomotives were withdrawn from stock between 1961 and 1965.

References

Sources 

 Pat Rowledge Stanier 4-6-0s of the LMS

London, Midland and Scottish Railway locomotives
4-6-0 locomotives
Railway locomotives introduced in 1935